Phyllonorycter durangensis is a moth of the family Gracillariidae. It is known from Mexico.

The larvae feed on Alnus species. They mine the leaves of their host plant. The mine has the form of a very small gallery on the underside of the leaf.

References

durangensis
Moths of Central America
Moths described in 1982